Filippo Bona was a Roman Catholic prelate who served as Bishop of Famagusta (1530–1543).

Biography
On 29 October 1543, Filippo Bona was appointed during the papacy of Pope Paul III as Bishop of Famagusta. He served as Bishop of Famagusta until his death in 1552. While bishop, he was the principal co-consecrator of Leone Orsini, Bishop of Fréjus (1545); and Teodoro Pio, Bishop of Faenza (1545).

See also 
Catholic Church in Cyprus

References

External links and additional sources
 (for Chronology of Bishops) 
 (for Chronology of Bishops) 

16th-century Roman Catholic bishops in the Republic of Venice
1552 deaths
Bishops appointed by Pope Paul III